2015 was the 4th year in the history of RXF, the largest mixed martial arts promotion based in Romania.

List of events

RXF 16
 

RXF 16: Brașov was a mixed martial arts event that took place on February 16, 2015 at the Dumitru Popescu Arena in Brașov, Romania.

Results

RXF 17
 

RXF 17: Craiova was a mixed martial arts event that took place on March 16, 2015 at the Sala Polivalentă in Craiova, Romania.

Results

RXF 18
 

RXF 18: Stanciu vs. Belbiță was a mixed martial arts event that took place on June 15, 2015 at the BTarena in Cluj-Napoca, Romania.

Results

RXF 19
 

RXF 19: Galați was a mixed martial arts event that took place on August 31, 2015 at the Dunărea Ice Arena in Galați, Romania.

Results

RXF 20
 

RXF 20: Verhoeven vs. Bogutzki (also known as The Champion Is Here) was a mixed martial arts event that took place on October 19, 2015 at the Sala Transilvania in Sibiu, Romania.

The event marked the MMA debut for the No. 1 heavyweight kickboxer in the world Rico Verhoeven.

Results

RXF 21
 

RXF 21: All Stars was a mixed martial arts event that took place on December 14, 2015 at the Sala Polivalentă in Bucharest, Romania.

Results

See also
 2015 in UFC
 2015 in Bellator MMA
 2015 in ONE Championship
 2015 in Absolute Championship Berkut
 2015 in Konfrontacja Sztuk Walki
 2015 in Romanian kickboxing

References

External links
RXF 

2015 in mixed martial arts
Real Xtreme Fighting events